Langham may refer to:

Places

Australia 

 The Langham, Melbourne, a luxury hotel in Melbourne

Canada
Langham, Saskatchewan

England
Langham, Dorset
Langham, Essex
Langham, Norfolk
Langham, Northumberland
Langham, Rutland
Langham, Somerset
Langham, Suffolk
Langham Hotel, London, a hotel in London
The Langham School, an alternative name for Park View School, West Green

United States 

 The Langham, New York, a luxury hotel in Manhattan, New York City
 The Langham (apartment building), a luxury apartment building in Manhattan, New York City
 The Langham Huntington, Pasadena, a luxury hotel in Pasadena, California

People
Langham Baronets, a title in the baronetcy of England
Sir Charles Langham, 13th Baronet (1870–1951), English entomologist and photographer
Antonio Langham (born 1972), former American professional football player
Bianca Langham-Pritchard (born 1975), Australian field hockey player
Chris Langham (born 1949), British comedy actor
Derald Langham (1913–1991), American geneticist researcher
Elias Langham (1749–1830), American politician, land surveyor and soldier 
Franklin Langham (born 1968), American professional golfer
J. N. Langham (1861–1945), American politician from Pennsylvania
Michael Langham (born 1919), British actor and director
Nat Langham (1820–1871), English boxer
Simon Langham (1310–1376), Archbishop of Canterbury
Sophie Langham, English actress
Wallace Langham (born 1965), American actor
Wright Haskell Langham (1911-1972), expert in the fields of plutonium exposure, aerospace and aviation medicine, Mr. Plutonium

Other
Langham Estate, a property estate in Fitzrovia, London, United Kingdom
Langham Hotels International, a group which runs various hotels including:
Langham Hotel, London
Cordis, Hong Kong
Langham Place, Hong Kong
The Langham Huntington, Pasadena, California
Langham Island, an island, Illinois, United States
Langham Partnership International a nonprofit Christian international fellowship 
Langham Place, London, a location in London where the first Langham Hotel and All Souls Church were built
RAF Langham, an English military airbase during WWII
The Langham (apartment building), an apartment building in New York City, United States

See also
 Langham House (disambiguation)